"No Eager Men" was the second 7" by Californian punk rock band Swingin' Utters, released in 1993.

 The cover calls the band "the Swingin' Utters" for the first time, thus losing the Johnny Peebucks moniker.
 Originally released as a 7" record, two of these songs would be re-recorded for The Streets of San Francisco.
 The song "Here We Are Nowhere" is a cover, originally done by Stiff Little Fingers.

Track listing
 "No Eager Men"
 "Here We Are Nowhere" 
 "Petty Wage" 
 "Hello Charlatan"

Personnel
 Johnny Bonnel (vocals) 
 Greg McEntee (drums) 
 Darius Koski (guitar) 
 Kevin Wickersham (bass) 
 Max Huber (guitar)

External links
 Swingin' Utters official discography

Swingin' Utters albums
1992 singles